The following units and commanders fought at the Battle of Salamanca on July 22, 1812 during the Peninsular War.

Abbreviations used

Military rank
 Gen = General
 Lt Gen = Lieutenant-General
 Maj Gen = Major-General
 GD = général de division
 Brig Gen = Brigadier-General
 GB = général de brigade
 Col = Colonel
 Lt Col = Lieutenant Colonel
 Maj = Major
 Capt = Captain
 Lt = Lieutenant

Other
 (w) = wounded
 (mw) = mortally wounded
 (k) = killed in action
 (c) = captured

Allied Army
Commander-in-Chief of the Allied Army: Lt Gen the Earl of Wellington (local General)

Commander-in-Chief of the Portuguese Army: Marshal William C. Beresford (w)

Lt Col William H. De Lancey, Deputy Quartermaster-General (acting as Quartermaster-General)

Lt Col Sir John May, Adjutant-General (Royal Artillery) (w)

Lt Col R. Lawrence Dundas

Lt Col Henry Sturgeon

Lt Col John Waters

Maj George Scovell

Mr. John Bisset, Commissary-General

Dr. James McGrigor, Surgeon-General

Brig Gen Don Miguel R. de Álava y Esquivel, Spanish Liaison officer

Brig Gen Don Joseph O'Lawlor, Spanish Liaison officer

French Army
Marshal Auguste de Marmont, Commander-in-Chief (w)

GD Jean Pierre François Bonet (w)

GD Bertrand Clausel (w)

Chief of Artillery: GB Louis Tirlet

Sources
 Muir, Rory. Salamanca 1812. New Haven, Connecticut: Yale University Press, 2001. .
 Fletcher, Ian. Men-at-Arms Campaign 48: Salamanca 1812. Great Britain: Osprey History, 1991. .

Peninsular War orders of battle